Reconstructed clothing is used or vintage clothing that has been redesigned and resewn into a new garment.  Reconstructed clothing became trendy in the mid-2000s.  During this first wave of trend, Generation T (2006), which gave instructions for "108 Ways to Transform a T-Shirt", was published.  The book included instructions for how to make halter tops, A-line skirts, and string bikinis out of T-shirts. In 2008, Nicolay released another book entitled: Generation T-Beyond Fashion 120 More Ways to Transform Your T's. This book had a bigger variety of projects including ones for children, men, and even pets. 

In March 2006, the DIY group Compai released their first DIY clothing reconstruction book, 99 Ways to Cut, Sew, Trim, and Tie Your T-shirt Into Something Fabulous! After this book's release, Compai went on to release three more books about reconstructing jeans, sweaters and scarves.

During the latter half of the 2010s, reconstructed clothing became popular within high fashion. Brands such as RE/DONE and Vetements popularized jeans constructed from vintage denim. Marine Serre, winner of the 2017 LVMH prize for young designers, pledges a minimum of 50% of her collections consist of reconstructed clothing. 

Reconstructed clothing is appealing because it allows the designer to "stamp [their ideas] into an existing piece...and come up with a totally different piece" and because it makes the wearer's clothing unique.

References

2000s fashion
Fashion design